Vikramabahu II (died 1196) was King of Polonnaruwa in the twelfth century, who ruled in 1196, for three months. He succeeded his nephew Vira Bahu I as king of Polonnaruwa and was murdered and succeeded by another nephew Chodaganga, a son of his sister. He was the younger brother of Nissanka Malla.

See also
 List of Sri Lankan monarchs
 History of Sri Lanka

References

External links
 Kings & Rulers of Sri Lanka
 Codrington's Short History of Ceylon

Monarchs of Polonnaruwa
V
V
V